The 2000 PBA Expansion Draft was the second expansion draft of the Philippine Basketball Association (PBA). The draft was held in December 1999, so that the newly founded team Batang Red Bull Energizers could acquire players for the 2000 PBA season.

Key

Selections

Notes
 Number of years played in the PBA prior to the draft
 Caidic did not play for Red Bull and retired immediately after being selected in the expansion draft.

References

Philippine Basketball Association expansion drafts
expansion draft
Barako Bull Energy Boosters
PBA Expansion Draft